Hardcore Devo: Volume Two is the last of two collections of demos by American new wave band Devo, released on August 23, 1991 by Rykodisc.

Background
The Hardcore Devo albums are collections of 4-track basement demos recorded by the band between 1974–1977. Some tracks are earlier versions of some of Devo's best known tracks that would later be re-recorded and used on subsequent Devo records (e.g. "Jocko Homo," "Mongoloid"), but a majority of the tracks were never re-used and remained unreleased until the Hardcore Devo compilations.

Hardcore Devo: Volume Two was out of print for years; however, it was re-issued by Superior Viaduct in 2013, both as a vinyl release (May 2013) and a CD containing both volumes and bonus tracks (July 2013).

Track listing

Personnel
Credits adapted from liner notes of Superior Viaduct 2013 reissue:

Devo
Gerald Casale – lead vocals (2, 4–5, 7–8, 10–12, 16–20, 22–23), backing vocals (3, 9, 13), bass guitar, drums (16), acoustic guitar (23)
Mark Mothersbaugh – vocals (3, 6, 12–14, 17, 21, 24), synthesizers
Bob Mothersbaugh – lead vocals (9, 15, 25), background vocals (8), guitar
Jim Mothersbaugh – drums (1–15, 18)

Additional personnel
Bob Casale – additional guitar (8, 17, 19–20)
Alan Myers – drums (17, 19–20)
Bob Lewis – additional guitar (5, 8)
Booji Boy – vocals (11)

Technical

Credits adapted from liner notes of original Rykodisc 1991 issue:

Devo – engineers, mixers
Bernie Grundman – mastering
Barbara Watson – photography
Lisa Laarman – design

Credits adapted from Devo: The Brand (2018):

Devo – photo concept, art direction
Moshe Brakha – photography

See also
Hardcore Devo: Volume One

References

External links

Devo compilation albums
Demo albums
1991 compilation albums
Rykodisc compilation albums